The 2018 Clemson Tigers women's soccer team represented Clemson University during the 2018 NCAA Division I women's soccer season.  The Tigers were led by head coach Ed Radwanski, in his eighth season.  Home games were played at Riggs Field.  This was the team's 25th season playing organized soccer.  All of those seasons were played in the Atlantic Coast Conference.

Previous season

The 2017 Clemson women's soccer team finished the season with a 10–5–3 overall record and a 3–4–3 ACC record. The Tigers failed to make the ACC Tournament, finishing 9th in the conference.  The Tigers earned an at-large bid into the 2017 NCAA Division I Women's Soccer Tournament for the fifth season in a row. As an unseeded team in the Duke Bracket, Clemson beat Alabama at home 2–1, but fell in the second round to 4th seeded Texas on penalties.

Offseason

Departures

Recruiting Class

Clemson announced its 2018 recruiting class of six players on February 9, 2018.

Squad

Roster

Updated August 3, 2018

Prior to the season, Lauren Harkes, Kimber Haley, and Sam Staab were announced as team captains.

Team management

Source:

Schedule

|-
!colspan=6 style=""| Exhibition

|-
!colspan=6 style=""| Non-Conference Regular season

|-
!colspan=6 style=""| Conference Regular season

|-
!colspan=6 style=""| ACC Tournament

|-
!colspan=6 style=""| NCAA Tournament

Goals Record

Disciplinary record

Awards and honors

Rankings

2019 NWSL Draft

The Tigers had one player drafted in the 2019 draft, Sam Staab, was taken as the 4th pick.  This is the highest any Clemson player has been picked in an NWSL draft.

References

External links

Clemson
2018 in sports in South Carolina
Clemson
Clemson Tigers women's soccer seasons